Pulmonaria saccharata, the Bethlehem lungwort or Bethlehem sage, is a species of flowering plant in the family Boraginaceae, native to France and Italy. It is a rhizomatous herbaceous perennial which is closely related to the common lungwort (Pulmonaria officinalis).

The specific epithet saccharata means sugared, and refers to the spotted surface of the leaves.

Cultivation
It prefers shaded, nutrient-rich, moist, well-drained soil. Numerous cultivars have been developed, of which the following have gained the Royal Horticultural Society's Award of Garden Merit:-
  
Argentea Group
'Cotton Cool'  
'Lewis Palmer' 
'Sissinghurst White'

References

saccharata
Taxa named by Philip Miller